Wojciech Reiman (born 5 August 1988) is a Polish professional footballer who plays as a central midfielder for Motor Lublin.

Career

Reiman started his career with Stal Rzeszów.

References

External links
 

1988 births
Living people
Polish footballers
Association football midfielders
Ekstraklasa players
I liga players
II liga players
III liga players
Polonia Bytom players
Stal Stalowa Wola players
Podbeskidzie Bielsko-Biała players
Raków Częstochowa players
Stal Rzeszów players
Olimpia Grudziądz players
Puszcza Niepołomice players
OKS Stomil Olsztyn players
Motor Lublin players